Baroa punctivaga is a moth of the subfamily Arctiinae. It was described by Francis Walker in 1855 and is found on Java.

References

Arctiini